The Rod Davidson Cup was the name of the trophy awarded to the post-season champion of the second All American Hockey League. The cup, originally called the Champions Cup, was named in honor of Rod Davidson, who had been an instrumental part of the All American Hockey League through coaching, management, and finally as commissioner.

The past winners are:
 2008-09 – Chi-Town Shooters
 2009-10 – Evansville IceMen
 2010-11 – Battle Creek Revolution

All American Hockey League (2008–2011)